Sean Whelan may refer to:

 Sean Whelan (journalist), Irish journalist
 Sean Whelan (scientist), British-American virologist